This is a list of player movements for Super Rugby teams prior to the end of the 2018 Super Rugby season. Departure and arrivals of all players that were included in a Super Rugby squad for 2017 or 2018 are listed here, regardless of when it occurred. Future-dated transfers are only included if confirmed by the player or his agent, his former team or his new team.

In addition to the main squad, teams can also name additional players that train in backup or development squads for the franchises.

Notes 
 2017 players listed are all players that were named in the initial senior squad, or subsequently included in a 23-man match day squad at any game during the season.
 (did not play) denotes that a player did not play at all during one of the two seasons due to injury or non-selection. These players are included to indicate they were contracted to the team.
 (short-term) denotes that a player wasn't initially contracted, but came in during the season. This could either be a club rugby player coming in as injury cover, or a player whose contract had expired at another team (typically in the northern hemisphere).
 Flags are only shown for players moving to or from another country.
 Players may play in several positions, but are listed in only one.

Transfers

Bulls

Cheetahs

On 7 July 2017, the South African Rugby Union announced that the Cheetahs (along with the Kings) would no longer participate in Super Rugby, following an earlier decision from SANZAAR to reduce the number of South African teams from six teams to four for 2018. All players moved to the Cheetahs Pro14 team unless otherwise indicated.

Kings

On 7 July 2017, the South African Rugby Union announced that the Kings (along with the Cheetahs) would no longer participate in Super Rugby, following an earlier decision from SANZAAR to reduce the number of South African teams from six teams to four for 2018. All players moved to the Kings Pro14 team unless otherwise indicated.

Lions

Sharks

Stormers

See also

 List of 2017–18 Premiership Rugby transfers
 List of 2017–18 Pro14 transfers
 List of 2017–18 Top 14 transfers
 List of 2017–18 RFU Championship transfers
 SANZAAR
 Super Rugby franchise areas

Notes

References

2018
2018 Super Rugby season
2017 Super Rugby season